Gulf Shores is a resort city in Baldwin County, Alabama, United States. As of the 2010 Census, the population was 9,741.

Geography
Gulf Shores is located on the Gulf of Mexico, and is the southernmost settlement in the state of Alabama. It is served by Alabama State Route 59 (Gulf Shores Parkway), which leads north to Foley. Route 182 (Beach Boulevard) runs east-west along the shore front, while Route 180 (Fort Morgan Road) runs parallel to it, north of Little Lagoon. Gulf State Park occupies a large eastern part of the city.

Climate
Gulf Shores has a humid subtropical climate, with long, hot summers, and mild and sunny winters. With bright sunny summers and warm winters, Alabama Gulf Coast weather offers year-round opportunities for beach-going, fishing, and golfing. Winters are generally mild and residents can enjoy outside activities the majority of the time. Summers are hot, which makes for great beach weather and the sea breeze provides relief from the heat as well as humidity. Daytime highs in summer are near  and evening lows near . While the area enjoys a strong "snowbird" season from December to April, many locals say that May/June and October/November are the best months. Ocean surf temperatures are quite warm from May through November, often well into the low 80s.

As a result of being located on the northern coast of the Gulf of Mexico, Gulf Shores is vulnerable to tropical cyclones. In September 1979, Hurricane Frederic caused massive destruction, leveling most of the town. On September 16, 2004, Hurricane Ivan made landfall in Gulf Shores, causing extensive wind and flooding damage. In 2005, while the city was still cleaning up from Ivan, Hurricane Katrina caused extensive damage and flooding. The area was then struck again on September 16, 2020 when Hurricane Sally made landfall on the 16 year anniversary of Ivan, causing extensive damage and widespread flooding.

Demographics

2020 census

As of the 2020 United States census, there were 15,014 people, 5,810 households, and 3,347 families residing in the city.

2010 census
As of the census of 2010, there were 9,741 people living in the city. The racial makeup of the city was 97.54% White, 0.22% Black or African American, 0.44% Native American, 0.30% Asian, 0.04% Pacific Islander, 0.40% from other races, and 1.07% from two or more races. Of the population 1.23% were Hispanic or Latino of any race.

There were 2,344 households, out of which 20.7% had children under the age of 18 living with them, 56.2% were married couples living together, 7.0% had a female householder with no husband present, and 34.1% were non-families. Of all households 26.7% were made up of individuals, and 10.0% had someone living alone who was 65 years of age or older. The average household size was 2.15 and the average family size was 2.56.

Of the population 16.4% was under the age of 18, 6.7% from 18 to 24, 24.8% from 25 to 44, 29.0% from 45 to 64, and 23.1% who were 65 years of age or older. The median age was 46 years. For every 100 females, there were 97.3 males. For every 100 females age 18 and over, there were 95.5 males. The median income for a household in the city was $41,826, and the median income for a family was $51,862. Males had a median income of $40,259 versus $22,467 for females. The per capita income for the city was $24,356. About 6.8% of families and 9.9% of the population were below the poverty line, including 6.4% of those under age 18 and 6.5% of those age 65 or over.

Since the year 2000, Baldwin County as a whole has experienced rapid population growth, second only to Shelby County in Alabama.

Economy

Tourism
Tourism dominates the economy of Gulf Shores. The 2010 BP oil spill was expected to adversely affect both local real estate and beach tourism. After a year of decline, the tourism economy in Gulf Shores returned to pre-spill levels.

Attractions in Gulf Shores include Alabama Gulf Coast Zoo; Pelican Place at Craft Farms, a shopping mall; Waterville USA, a family amusement/waterpark; and 10 golf courses. 

Hangout Music Festival is an annual three-day music festival on the beach each May.

Some residents opposed the building of a new hotel on state property, and the use of BP Oil spill funds to finance projects other than environmental repair.

In 2022, the city introduced a plan to make a $15 million revitalization of Gulf Place, a public beach area.  Amenities will include a boardwalk, parking, green space, and restrooms.  The project will involve sustainable and low-impact development strategies, including stormwater management, and beach dune restoration to provide animal habitat and protection from storm surge.

Education
Public education was originally administered by Baldwin County Public Schools. The Gulf Shores City School System was established in 2017.  Schools include:
 Gulf Shores High School (grades 9–12)
 Gulf Shores Middle School (grades 7–8)
 Gulf Shores Elementary School (grades K–6)

Infrastructure
Jack Edwards National Airport is located in Gulf Shores and offers services from Gulf Air Center, Salt Air Aviation Center and Platium Air Center.

References

External links

 

Beaches of Alabama
Cities in Alabama
Cities in Baldwin County, Alabama
Landforms of Baldwin County, Alabama
Populated coastal places in Alabama